Solomon Owusu Bonnah (born 19 August 2003) is a Dutch professional footballer who plays as a right-back for Austrian Bundesliga club Austria Klagenfurt.

Career
A youth product of Zeeburgia and Ajax, Bonnah joined the youth academy of RB Leipzig in 2019. He signed his first professional contract with the club on 14 October 2021. He made his UEFA Champions League debut with RB Leipzing in a 5–0 win over against Club Brugge on 24 November 2021, coming on as a sub in the 79th minute. Four days later, Bonnah made his Bundesliga debut, coming off the bench in the 84th minute for Lukas Klostermann in a 3–1 loss to Bayer Leverkusen.

On 31 August 2022, Bonnah signed a three-year contract with Austria Klagenfurt in Austria.

International career
Born in the Netherlands, Bonnah is of Ghanaian descent. He is a youth international for the Netherlands.

Honours
RB Leipzig
DFB-Pokal: 2021–22

References

External links
 

2003 births
Living people
Dutch footballers
Netherlands youth international footballers
Dutch sportspeople of Ghanaian descent
Association football fullbacks
RB Leipzig players
SK Austria Klagenfurt players
Bundesliga players
Dutch expatriate footballers
Dutch expatriate sportspeople in Germany
Expatriate footballers in Germany
Dutch expatriate sportspeople in Austria
Expatriate footballers in Austria